Sir John Lloyd, 1st Baronet (ca. 1617 – 1 January 1664) was a Welsh politician who sat in the House of Commons at various times between 1646 and 1660.

He was the son of Griffith Lloyd of Fforest Brechfa, Carmarthenshire and studied law at Gray's Inn (1635). In 1646, Lloyd was elected Member of Parliament (MP) for Carmarthenshire as a recruiter to the Long Parliament.  He was secluded  in Pride's Purge in 1648. 

In 1660, he was elected MP for Carmarthenshire again in the Cavalier Parliament and was briefly custos rotulorum for  Carmarthenshire from March - July 1660. He served as a deputy lieutenant for the county from 1661 to his death. On 28 February 1662, he was made a baronet. He lived in Woking, Surrey.

Family
Lloyd married the Hon. Beatrice Annesley, daughter of Francis Annesley, 1st Viscount Valentia and his wife Dorothy Philipps, widow of James Zouch (1615–1643). Their son, John, succeeded to the baronetcy. His daughter, Beatrice, married Sir John Barlow, 1st Baronet of Slebetch.

References

Sources
 

Members of the Parliament of England (pre-1707) for constituencies in Wales
Baronets in the Baronetage of England
1610s births
1664 deaths
Year of birth uncertain
Members of Gray's Inn
English MPs 1640–1648
English MPs 1660
Deputy Lieutenants of Carmarthenshire